Kim Rørbæk (born 11 December 1948) is a Danish rower. He competed in the men's coxless pair event at the 1976 Summer Olympics.

References

1948 births
Living people
Danish male rowers
Olympic rowers of Denmark
Rowers at the 1976 Summer Olympics
Place of birth missing (living people)